The Y-bar shrimpgoby (Cryptocentrus fasciatus) is a species of goby widespread in the Indo-West-Pacific from East Africa to Melanesia and the Great Barrier Reef.  This species can be found on reefs at depths of from  where they live in burrows in sandy substrates.  They are symbiotic with alpheid shrimps.  This species can reach a length of  TL.  It can also be found in the aquarium trade.

References

External links
 

Y-bar shrimpgoby
Y-bar shrimpgoby